Nguyễn Văn Huyền (9 December 1911 – 1995) was a Vietnamese lawyer and politician, who served as the last Vice President of South Vietnam under President Dương Văn Minh in 1975. He served as the first President of the South Vietnamese Senate from 1967 to 1973. He took the position of Vice President from new President Dương Văn Minh, who was trying to hold peace talks, but held the position for only 2 days before the fall of the Republic of Vietnam on April 30, 1975. In the last years of his life, he was invited to join the Vietnam Fatherland Front of the unified Socialist Republic of Vietnam as an independent and was elected as a member of its Central Committee's Presidium, where he died in office in 1995.

Early life and career
He was born on 9 December 1911 in Sóc Trăng, Tân Trụ district, Long An province, from a long-standing Catholic family with a moral background. As a child, he studied in Tân An, then Saigon. In the late 1920s, he went to France to study abroad for a while. After returning home, he studied and graduated with a Bachelor of Laws from Indochina Law University in Hanoi .

After practicing as a lawyer in Saigon for a while, he opened his own law office and gradually became known for his defense cases for political defendants such as Hà Huy Tập (1940), Nguyễn Hữu Thọ, Nguyễn Văn Dưỡng, Phan Kiến Khương in the 1950 Peace Movement in Saigon. In the Peace Movement case in 1950, he withdrew from the Bar Association to protest, but still together with lawyers Lê Văn Hổ and Trương Đình Dzu received an unpaid defense for the "defendant" Nguyễn Hữu Thọ. Before the court, he asserted: "Mr. Thọ has great influence in the people. Mr. Thọ has used that influence to do what must be done" .

After Ngô Đình Diệm announced the establishment of the Republic of Vietnam and held the position of President, although he was a Catholic intellectual, he kept his attitude of non-cooperation with Ngô Đình Diệm's ​​government to protest the political policy of the regime. Despite this, with his professional reputation as well as his reputation for ethics and integrity, he was still elected by the legal profession as the leader of the Bar Association. Besides, he also actively participates in Catholic movements independent of the government such as Vietnam Catholic Action Movement, Catholic Intellectual Movement (he also served as President of both movements). And was a member of the Vietnamese delegation to attend the Third International Conference of the Apostolate of the Laity (however he could not go at the last moment due to health reasons)

Political career
After the collapse of the First Republic government, he was invited to participate in the National Synod , participated in the drafting of the October 20, 1964 Covenant that handed over national sovereignty to the elected representative, replacing it. provisional Charter 4 November 1963 which placed power in the hands of the military. However, the political scene of the Republic of Vietnam was constantly disturbed by coups and power struggles among generals. It was not until the political scene of the Republic of Vietnam stabilized with the 1967 civil election that he ran for the Senate in the "Common Public and Social Justice" partnership (also known as the Bong Hue Alliance). After being elected as a Senator, with his prestige, he was elected as the President of the Senate  He was the first President of the Senate of the Republic of Vietnam.

Initially, against both the Ngô Đình Diệm and the military regime of General Nguyễn Khánh, he enthusiastically supported the civilian government of President Nguyễn Văn Thiệu . However, not long after, he soon changed his position and turned to oppose President Thiệu. He publicly declared against President Thieu's one-man election, so his consortium Bong Hue was later withdrawn by Nguyễn Văn Thiệu's government from running for the Senate in 1973. He also resigned from the Senate to oppose this decision.

Vice President of South Vietnam (1975)
In the years that followed, he was active in the Third Force, seeking a solution to end the war. Therefore, when President Trần Văn Hương transferred the position to General Dương Văn Minh, he accepted General Dương Văn Minh's invitation to accept the position of Vice President, in charge of peace talks. On the morning of April 28, 1975, he led a delegation consisting of him, Prime Minister Vũ Văn Mẫu and Brigadier General Nguyễn Hữu Hạnh to Camp Davies to meet with the military delegation of the Provisional Revolutionary Government of the Republic of South Vietnam. At 3:00pm, he officially accepted the position of Vice President at the recommendation of the new President Dương Văn Minh. At 7:00pm on the same day, he read a summons on Radio Saigon, reporting on negotiations with the Provisional Revolutionary Government of the Republic of South Vietnam and calling on the people to respect the law and avoid panic, army and police forces kept order and kept a straight hand against robbers and looters.

The very next morning, April 29, 1975, he sent another delegation consisting of 4 people, Mr. Nguyễn Văn Diệp (General Manager), Nguyễn Văn Hạnh (contractor), Tô Văn Cang (engineer), Nguyễn Đình Đầu (engineer), to enter Camp Davies to meet with the delegation of the Provisional Revolutionary Government of the Republic of South Vietnam to discuss the ceasefire. The result of the meeting could not be successful when the Provisional Revolutionary Government of the Republic of South Vietnam was completely sure of victory. Therefore, he decided to submit to President Duong Van Minh a draft statement "Accepting the Ceasefire Conditions of the National Front for the Liberation of South Vietnam." Co-written by Mr. Nguyễn Văn Diệp and Mr. Nguyễn Đình Đầu, with the aim of avoiding unnecessary bloodshed. President Dương Văn Minh approved and he published this version on Radio Saigon at 5:00pm on April 29, 1975.

On April 30, 1975, at 6 a.m., he, together with President Dương Văn Minh, Prime Minister Vũ Văn Mẫu and some people in the cabinet, had a meeting and decided not to shoot, handing over the government to the Provisional Revolutionary Government of the Republic of South Vietnam. All were present at the palace until the Liberation Army soldiers entered the Independence Palace.

Post-Fall of Saigon
After April 30, 1975, he, like other members of General Dương Văn Minh's government, was not sent to re- education but remained under house arrest. Although some were later allowed to go abroad, he remained in Vietnam and he lived quietly in Ho Chi Minh City. He was once invited to join the Ho Chi Minh City Fatherland Front, the Central Fatherland Front, but he declined due to poor health. Until the last years of his life, he accepted an invitation from his old friend Nguyễn Hữu Thọ to join the Vietnam Fatherland Front , and with the introduction of Mr. Nguyễn Hữu Thọ, he was elected a member of the Presidium of the Central Committee of the Vietnam Fatherland Front.

He died in 1995 in Ho Chi Minh City.

Personal life
Lawyer Nguyễn Văn Huyền is considered a member of the Third Force , a group of ethnic intellectuals living and working under the Republic of Vietnam regime. A devout Catholic, he was known as a virtuous and honest man, who, despite being in high positions of power, still lived an ascetic life. Throughout his political career, he has not been involved in any financial or political ethics scandals or mistreated his colleagues or dissidents. Therefore, although he has a gentle personality, he still has a great reputation and influence on those around him.

"Mr. Huyền is not a Communist but a religious person and a good person. When the Pope called for peace, Mr. Huyền aimed to end the war and restore peace. By 1975, Dương Văn Minh established the government and invited Mr. Huyền to be the Vice President in charge of peace talks." - Researcher Nguyễn Đình Đầu 
"You are a patriotic intellectual. I always thought that you cannot leave your country." - Lawyer Nguyễn Hữu Thọ, former acting President of the Socialist Republic of Vietnam

References

1911 births
1995 deaths
South Vietnamese politicians
Members of the National Assembly (South Vietnam)
Vietnamese politicians